The United States Army Medical Materiel Center-Korea (USAMMC-K), a subordinate unit of Army Medical Logistics Command (AMLC) at Fort Detrick, Maryland, serves as the Theater Lead Agent for Medical Materiel (TLAMM) in South Korea.

USAMMC-K's mission is to provide continuous medical logistics support to United States Forces Korea (USFK).

History
The 6th Medical Logistics Depot was constituted as an inactive unit of the Regular Army on 21 December 1928, Fort Sam Houston, Texas.

During World War II, the unit served in the European Theater and was known as the 6th Medical Depot Company.

Following World War II, the unit was inactivated at Camp Kilmer, New Jersey on 18 January 1946 and later reactivated at Fort Jackson, South Carolina on 15 July 1946.

Following reorganization as the 6th Army medical Depot on 1 March 1949, the Depot arrived in Japan on 28 August 1950. It was immediately assigned to the Korean Theater and landed in Pusan, Korea on 11 September 1950. During the Korean War, platoons of the 6th Army Medical Depot were deployed throughout Korea.

Following the war, the Depot was re-designated as the 6th Medical Depot (Army) on 11 April 1954 and in November 1955 was relocated to Ascom City, Korea.

The 6th Medical Depot (Army) was assigned to the Eighth United States Army from 1950 until April 1960, when it was reassigned to the 7th Logistical Command. In May 1963, it was reassigned to the 65th Medical Group under the operational control of the Eighth United States Army Surgeon. The 6th Medical Depot was reassigned from the 65th Medical Group to the Eighth United States Army Medical Command-Korea on 21 June 1971.

The Medical Depot moved to Yongsan Military Reservation Supply Point 51 on 1 June 1973. On 1 January 1978, the Medical Depot was reorganized and redesignated as the 6th Medical Supply, Optical and Maintenance Unit (MEDSOM).

The 6th MEDSOM Battalion relocated its Battalion Headquarters Company, Stock Control Division, and Optical Division on 11 January 1988 to Camp Carroll (Waegwan, Korea). The move of the Distribution Division and the Quality Control Division to Camp Carroll was completed on 8 February 1990.

The 16th Medical Logistics Battalion (Logistics, Forward) was deactivated in October 2008 and was replaced by the US Army Medical Materiel Center-Korea.

Commanders of the U.S. Army Medical Materiel Center-Korea and its precursors

References 
This article contains information that originally came from US Government publications and websites and is in the public domain.

External links 
 

Medical units and formations of the United States Army